Otto Carl Franz Toepfer (January 13, 1872 – February 17, 1949) was a member of the Wisconsin State Assembly.

Biography
Toepfer was born in Middleton, Wisconsin. He died on February 17, 1949 and is buried at Forest Hill Cemetery in Madison, Wisconsin.

Career
Toepfer was a member of the Assembly from 1939 to 1940. He was a farmer and was involved with agricultural and cattle raising associations. He was a director of a bank and a trust company. He was a Republican. He served on the Madison and Middleton town boards and was also on the Dane County, Wisconsin Board of Supervisors.

References

People from Middleton, Wisconsin
Businesspeople from Wisconsin
County supervisors in Wisconsin
Republican Party members of the Wisconsin State Assembly
1872 births
1949 deaths